Russian Field is a 1972 Soviet drama film directed by Nikolai Moskalenko. It took the 22nd place in terms of attendance among domestic films in the Soviet Union.

Plot 
Fedosia Ugryumova (Nonna Mordyukova) for many is a model of a loving wife, mother, worker. But the son of Philip (Vladimir Tikhonov) has grown, the husband Avdyei (Leonid Markov) leaves her for young Nadya (Lyudmila Khityaeva) and Fedosia's world starts to collapse.

Cast 
Nonna Mordyukova as Fedosia Ugryumova
 Vladimir Tikhonov as Philipp Ugriumov, Fedosya's and Avdei's son
Leonid Markov as Avdei Ugriumov
Inna Makarova as Maria Solovyova
 Lyubov Malinovskaya as Antonina
Lyudmila Khityaeva as Nadya, Avdei's second wife
 Zoya Fyodorova as Matrona
 Nina Maslova as Nina, daughter Antonina
 Vyacheslav Nevinny as Pavel Fomich Fedchenkov
 Lyudmila Gladunko as Tanya, Philipp's bride

Awards 
In 1972, Nonna Mordyukova was recognized as the best actress as voted by the magazine Soviet Screen.

References

External links
 
 Russian Field on the official website Mosfilm Studios

1972 drama films
Soviet drama films
Mosfilm films
1972 films